Frances Evelyn Cave-Browne-Cave FRAS (1876–1965) was an English mathematician and educator.

Early life
Frances Cave-Browne-Cave was the daughter of Sir Thomas Cave-Browne-Cave and Blanche Matilda Mary Ann Milton. She was educated at home in Streatham Common with her sisters and entered Girton College, Cambridge, with her elder sister Beatrice Mabel Cave-Browne-Cave in 1895. She obtained a first-class degree and she would have been Fifth Wrangler in 1898 if she had been a man. She took Part II of the Mathematical Tripos in 1899.

Career and continued studies
Like her sister, she was usually known by the single surname Cave professionally. Along with Beatrice, she worked with Karl Pearson at University College London. Her work was funded by the first research grant offered at Girton: an Old Students' Research Studentship from Girton, provided by Florence Margaret Durham. Her research in the field of meteorology produced two publications in the Proceedings of the Royal Society which discussed barometric measurements, and was read to the British Association at Cambridge in 1904.

In 1903, Cave returned to Girton as a fellow. She prioritised teaching over research, and focused on developing the weakest students because she felt that was where the biggest difference could be made. She became the director of studies in 1918. She was on the executive council of the college and was largely responsible for drafting the charter of incorporation granted in 1924. On the 11 November 1921 she was elected a Fellow of the Royal Astronomical Society. Cave was made honorary fellow of Girton in 1942.

Cave received an MA from Trinity College, Dublin, in 1907 (since the rules of Cambridge University did not then permit women to take degrees) and from Cambridge in 1926.

Later life and death
Cave retired to Southampton in 1936. She died in Shedfield in a nursing home on 30 March 1965.

References

External links
 Papers in Girton College Library

1876 births
1965 deaths
19th-century English mathematicians
20th-century English mathematicians
British women mathematicians
Alumni of Girton College, Cambridge
Fellows of Girton College, Cambridge
20th-century women mathematicians